Cairo Eye, also known as Ain Cairo is a ferris wheel under construction located on the banks of the Nile River in the Zamalek district of Cairo, Egypt.

In recent years, the adjacent city of Giza, home to the Sphinx and pyramids, has received the lion's share of tourism projects. From Giza's long-awaited Grand Egyptian Museum to the new pyramids visitor center and the recently opened Sphinx International Airport, Egypt is betting big on Giza tourism and hopes the same for Cairo.

In accordance with Egypt's 2030 Vision, Egypt aims to resuscitate its tourism sector with the new tourist attraction. As Egypt’s tourism authority anticipates that the wheel will certainly boost Egypt's economy, especially after the effects of the coronavirus pandemic.

Facilities 
Cairo Eye is placed near one of Cairo's major archaeological attractions, the Cairo Tower, and it aims to link both entertainment and cultural learning together, set to have an integrated recreational area established around the Ferris wheel to serve as a tourist destination.

The wheel will have 48 total cabins with a panoramic 360 view of Cairo with a capacity of 6-8 passengers for each cabin, and will carry around 15,000 visitors a day.

The Cairo Eye will also include services and facilities like retailers of international brands, fine dining restaurants, a food court, an entertainment and events area as well as a  multi-purpose hall overlooking the Nile River.

As for the inevitable congestion and traffic jams, the project will be provided with a covered car parking area (two levels) with a capacity of 500 vehicles, 'Ain Cairo taxi services' and 'Ain Cairo free transport drop on/off buses' as well as river transportation.

Tickets to ride the Cairo Eye are expected to range between $15 and $22, but prices will be reviewed once the project is complete.

Construction 
The beginning of construction on the Cairo Eye wheel was officially announced by the Governor of Cairo on January 21, 2021 and it comes to support the Egypt Vision 2030 strategy to boost tourism in Egypt and economic development launched by the president of Egypt, Abdel Fattah el-Sisi. The project is owned by Hawaii Tourism, which are in negotiations with 4 banks to finance 50% of the investment cost of the Cairo Eye project.

Cairo Eye is set to be completed and opened in 2022 at a cost of EGP 500 million ($32 million), providing 1,200 direct job opportunities and 4,000 indirect job opportunities.

Concerns

Location 
Zamalek residents have raised concerns over the project’s potential impact on the already-crowded district and its infrastructure. In order to preserve the identity and entity of the district, while taking into account the preservation of all trees and palms in the area, the project has adopted a plan to achieve an increase in the total green areas of the project by 15%؜ to reach  instead of the current .

Even after Cairo Eye officials stated that the project will actually increase total green space by 15%. Some stakeholders, such as Egyptian billionaire Naguib Sawiris, suggest moving the attraction closer to Egypt's New Administrative Capital, an under-construction local designed to alleviate Cairo congestion.

Traffic 
Cairo is notoriously gridlocked, and many residents and even government officials worry an attraction of this size could only worsen things. Project leaders stated that they have studied traffic management and proposed solutions like the Cairo Eye Nile Taxi, a hop-on-hop-off bus, and a parking garage set to hold up to 500 cars.

References 

Ferris wheels